The Serio Falls (Lombard: i Cascàde del Sère) are the tallest waterfall in Italy, and the second tallest waterfall in Europe.

Geography 

They are located 100 km north of Milan, 50 km from Bergamo, near the village of Valbondione, in the Bergamo Alps (Italian: Alpi Orobie) upper Valle Seriana, Province of Bergamo, in the alpine Lombardy region of Northern Italy. Located at 1751m MAMSL, the falls are composed of three main steps, respectively 166, 74 and 75 metres tall; taken together the falls have a drop of 315 m (more than 1000 ft). The falls are formed by the Serio River, at a short distance from its source in the Bergamo Alps (Alpi Orobie).

The falls are served by Bergamo Orio Al Serio airport (60 km), Milan-Linate (102 km) and Milan-Malpensa (145 km).

Depictions in culture 
The falls were used as a film location of the 2017 movie Call Me By Your Name by Luca Guadagnino.

References

Waterfalls of Lombardy
Province of Bergamo